Asu is the name of two languages:

 Asu language (Nigeria), spoken in Western Nigeria
 Asu language (Tanzania), spoken by the Gweno people in the Kilimanjaro Region of Tanzania